Cactoblastis ronnai is a species of snout moth in the genus Cactoblastis. It was described by Juan Brèthes in 1920 and is known from Brazil.

References

Phycitini
Moths described in 1920
Taxa named by Juan Brèthes